Lake Marie is a small freshwater lake in Umpqua Lighthouse State Park, near Winchester Bay, Oregon, USA.  It has a sandy beach at one end for swimming and day use, hiking trails surrounding it, and is overlooked by a couple of log cabins which can be rented.

References 

 http://www.traveloregon.com/Explore-Oregon/Oregon-Coast/Outdoor-Recreation/Camp-Oregon/Camping/Umpqua-Lighthouse-State-Park.aspx
 http://www.oregonstateparks.org/park_121.php
 http://www.hikercentral.com/campgrounds/117781.html
 http://www.oregon.gov/OPRD/PLANS/docs/masterplans/umpqua_lighthouse.pdf

External links 
http://www.oregonstateparks.org/park_121.php

Marie
Marie
Protected areas of Douglas County, Oregon